Eochaidh Ua Floinn was an Irish poet who held the post of Chief Ollam of Ireland. He died in AD 984. 
His poems are preserved in the Book of Lecan, Lebor Gabála Érenn and other manuscripts and include poems on the different invasions of Ireland. Edward O'Reilly gives a full account of these in his 'Irish Writers', XC sq.; d. anno 984.

Geoffrey Keating in his History of Ireland states- "Eochaidh Ua Floinn says in these verses: and he was the chief professor of poetry in Ireland in his time:—

Four sons, (who) were fierce of voice,
For noble children had Partholón:
They took under direction among them
The tribes of Ireland without objection

References

Medieval Irish poets
10th-century Irish poets
10th-century Irish writers
984 deaths
Year of birth unknown
Irish male poets
Irish-language writers